Georgiana Cavendish, Duchess of Devonshire (née Spencer;  ; 7 June 1757 – 30 March 1806), was an English aristocrat, socialite, political organiser, author, and activist. Born into the Spencer family, married into the Cavendish family, she was the first wife of William Cavendish, 5th Duke of Devonshire, and the mother of the 6th Duke of Devonshire.

As the Duchess of Devonshire, she garnered much attention and fame in society during her lifetime. With a preeminent position in the peerage of England, the Duchess was famous for her charisma, political influence, beauty, unusual marital arrangement, love affairs, socializing, and notorious for her gambling addiction, leading to an immense debt.

She was the great-great-great-great aunt of Diana, Princess of Wales. Their lives, centuries apart, have been compared in tragedy. She was also a great-great-great-aunt of Elizabeth II by marriage through the queen's maternal grandmother.

Early life and family

The Duchess was born Miss Georgiana Spencer, on 7 June 1757, as the first child of John Spencer (later Earl Spencer) and his wife, Georgiana (née Poyntz, later Countess Spencer), at the Spencer family home, Althorp. After her daughter's birth, her mother Lady Spencer wrote that "I will own I feel so partial to my Dear little Gee, that I think I never shall love another so well." Two younger siblings followed: Henrietta ("Harriet") and George. The daughter of her sister Henrietta, Lady Caroline Lamb, would become a writer and lover of Lord Byron. John Spencer, a great-grandson of John Churchill, 1st Duke of Marlborough, came from a wealthy English noble family. He built a Spencer family residence at St. James's, London, and raised his children there. The parents raised Georgiana and her siblings in a happy marriage, which bears no record of there ever having been any extramarital affairs – a rarity in the era. Meanwhile, Georgiana grew to be close to her mother, who was said to favour Georgiana over her other children.

When her father assumed the title of Viscount Spencer in 1761, she became The Honourable Georgiana Spencer. In 1765, her father became Earl Spencer, and she Lady Georgiana Spencer.

Marriage and children

On her seventeenth birthday, 7 June 1774, Lady Georgiana Spencer was married to society's most eligible bachelor, William Cavendish, the 5th Duke of Devonshire (aged 25). The wedding took place at Wimbledon Parish Church. It was a small ceremony attended only by her parents, her paternal grandmother Lady Cowper, one of her prospective brothers-in-law, and her soon-to-be sister-in-law, the Duchess of Portland. Her parents were emotionally reluctant to let their daughter go, but she was wed to one of the wealthiest and most powerful men in the land. Her father, who had always shown affection to his children, wrote to her, "My Dearest Georgiana, I did not know till lately how much I loved you; I miss you more every day and every hour". Mother and daughter continued to correspond throughout their lives, and many of their letters survive.

From the beginning of the marriage, the Duke of Devonshire, who was called "the Duke" by his family and friends, proved to be an emotionally reserved man who did not meet Georgiana's emotional needs. The spouses also had little in common. He would seldom be at her side and would spend nights at Brooks's playing cards. The Duke continued with adulterous behaviour throughout their married life, and discord followed pregnancies that ended in miscarriage or failure to produce a male heir.

Before their marriage, the Duke had fathered an illegitimate daughter, Charlotte Williams, born from a dalliance with a former milliner, Charlotte Spencer (of no relation to the House of Spencer). This was unknown to the Duchess until years after her marriage to the Duke. After the death of the child's mother, the Duchess was compelled to raise Charlotte herself. Georgiana was "very pleased" with Charlotte, although her own mother Lady Spencer expressed disapproval: "I hope you have not talk'd of her to people". The besotted Georgiana replied, "She is the best humoured little thing you ever saw".

In 1782, while on a retreat from London with the Duke, Georgiana met Lady Elizabeth Foster (widely known as "Bess") in the City of Bath. She became close friends with Bess, who had become destitute after separating from her husband and two sons. Given the bond that developed between the two women (and the difficult position her new friend was in), with the Duke's acquiescence Georgiana agreed to have Lady Elizabeth live with them. When the Duke began a sexual relationship with Lady Elizabeth, a ménage à trois was established, and it was arranged that Lady Elizabeth live with them permanently. While it was common for male members of the upper class to have mistresses, it was not common or generally acceptable for a mistress to live so openly with a married couple. Furthermore, Georgiana had been desperately lonely since her marriage to the Duke, and finally having found what she believed to be the ideal friend, she became emotionally codependent on Lady Elizabeth. Having no alternative, the Duchess became complicit in her best friend's affair with her husband the Duke. The arrangement among the three is more commonly referred to as a ménage à trois but, while the relationship between the Duke and Lady Elizabeth was obviously sexual, there is no concrete evidence of anything beyond emotional dependence and a particular and open affection on the part of Georgiana. In one of her letters, Georgiana wrote to Bess, "My dear Bess, Do you hear the voice of my heart crying to you? Do you feel what it is for me to be separated from you?" Nevertheless, Bess herself envied her and wished for her position. However, despite her envy Bess did indeed love Georgiana; at her death years later, a locket of Georgiana's hair was found around Elizabeth's neck, as well as a bracelet also containing hair of Georgiana on a table beside her deathbed. Lady Elizabeth insinuated her way into the marriage by taking advantage of the Duchess's friendship and codependency on her, and "engineered her way" into a sexual relationship with the Duke. Lady Elizabeth engaged in well documented sexual relations with other men while she was in the "love triangle" with the Duke and Duchess.  Among their contemporaries, the relationship between the Duchess of Devonshire and Lady Elizabeth Foster was the subject of speculation which has continued beyond their time. The love triangle itself was a notorious topic; it was an irregular arrangement in a high-profile marriage. Lady Elizabeth's affair with the Duke resulted in two illegitimate children: a daughter, Caroline Rosalie St Jules, and a son, Augustus Clifford.

Despite her unhappiness with her detached and philandering husband and volatile marriage, Georgiana, as contemporary norms dictated, was not socially permitted to take a lover without producing an heir. The first successful pregnancy resulted in the birth of Lady Georgiana Dorothy Cavendish on 12 July 1783. Called "Little G," she would become the Countess of Carlisle and have her own issue. Georgiana developed a strong mothering sentiment since raising Charlotte, and she insisted on nursing her own children (contrary to the aristocratic custom of having a wet nurse). On 29 August 1785, a second successful pregnancy resulted in another daughter: Lady Harriet Elizabeth Cavendish, called "Harryo," who would become Countess Granville and also have children of her own. Finally, on 21 May 1790, the Duchess gave birth to a male heir to the dukedom: William George Spencer Cavendish, who took the title of Marquess of Hartington at birth, and was called "Hart." He would never marry and became known as "the bachelor duke." With the birth of the Marquess of Hartington, Georgiana was able to take a lover. While there is no evidence of when Georgiana began her affair with Charles Grey (later Earl Grey), she did become pregnant by him in 1791. Sent off to France, Georgiana believed she would die in childbirth. Despondent, she wrote a letter to her recently born son stating, "As soon as you are old enough to understand this letter, it will be given to you. It contains the only present I can make you—my blessing, written in my blood...Alas, I am gone before you could know me, but I lov'd you, I nurs'd you nine months at my breast. I love you dearly." On 20 February 1792, Eliza Courtney was born without complications to mother and child. Georgiana's heart was broken yet again when she was forced to give away her illegitimate daughter Eliza to Grey's family. Georgiana would later be allowed to pay visits to her daughter, providing her with presents and affection, and Eliza would grow up to marry Lieutenant-Colonel Robert Ellice and bear a daughter named Georgiana.

While in exile in France in the early 1790s, Georgiana suffered from isolation and felt her separation from her children. To her eldest, she wrote, "Your letter dated the 1st of Nov was delightful to me tho' it made me very melancholy my Dearest Child. This year has been the most painful of my life. . . when I do return to you, never leave you I hope again—it will be too great a happiness for me Dear Georgiana & it will have been purchased by many days of regret – indeed ev'ry hour I pass away from you, I regret you; if I amuse myself or see anything I admire I long to share the happiness with you – if on the contrary, I am out of spirits I wish for your presence which alone would do me good". To return to England and her children, she conceded to her husband's demands and renounced her love for Charles Grey. Records of her exile in France were subsequently erased from the family records. However, the children of the Duke and Duchess had at one point been informed as to the reason of her absence during that period of their lives.

While the Duchess of Devonshire coped with the marital arrangements on the surface throughout her marriage, she nevertheless suffered emotional and psychological distress. She sought further personal consolation from a "dissipated existence" in passions (socialising, fashion, politics, writing), addictions (gambling, drinking, and drugs), and affairs (with several men, not just Grey, possibly including the bachelor John Sackville, 3rd Duke of Dorset).

Character
Georgiana was charismatic, generous, good-humored, and intelligent. Kindhearted, Georgiana instinctively wanted to help others and from a young age, happily gave her money to poor children  or her desperate friends. Lady Charlotte Bury wrote of Georgiana's generosity: "when some individual came to her in pecuniary distress, she would always relieve him or her, and leave her own difficulties unprovided for. Oftentimes she was wrong in doing so. ... One must be just before one is generous. But it is impossible not to be charmed by the kindly impulse which made her, without a moment's hesitating, shield another from distress." Georgiana's empathy extended towards animals as well. After noticing a starving cow in a field, Georgiana deduced its owner could not afford to feed it, and so she had the man found and gave him some money.

Despite being extremely self-conscious and making strenuous effort to appear perfect, Georgiana "always appeared natural, even when she was called upon to open a ball in front of 800 people. She could engage in friendly chatter with several people simultaneously" and still made each person feel special. Widely described as almost impossible to dislike, Georgiana captured the hearts of almost everyone she met. The artist Mrs Delaney, Mary Delany echoed many who recorded their experiences meeting Georgiana: "[She was] so agreeable, so obliging in her manner, that I am quite in love with her. I can't tell you the civil things she said, and really they deserve a better name, which is kindness embellished by politeness. I hope she will illumine and reform her contemporaries!" Even the prudish Frances Burney was begrudgingly won over by Georgiana's unassuming grace.  Georgiana was not a snob, and lacked the condescending airs of the aristocracy; she made people of all classes feel valued and at ease in her company. An example of her lack of airs was when Georgiana pointedly danced with French actor Monsieur Tessier after the Duchess of Manchester Elizabeth Montagu, Duchess of Manchester snobbishly refused to speak to him because he earned a living.    

From childhood, Georgiana showed a characteristic need to please others and a need for attention. Her mother Lady Spencer, Georgiana Spencer, Countess Spencer raised her to behave as if she were a courtier always on show, and this training only augmented her people pleasing tendencies. Lady Spencer knew she was partly responsible for her daughter's faults, and worried for her daughter's future. Her natural temperament combined with her breeding made Georgiana become an excitable, impressionable young woman vulnerable to peer pressure. Indeed, Georgiana did the opposite of what Mary Delany hoped and was instead corrupted by her contemporaries. Her inability to say no to her degenerate friends in the ton led Georgiana into many scrapes against her better judgement and made her feel shame over her behavior.

Pursuits and fame 
With her renowned unconventional beauty and kind character, alongside her marriage to the affluent and powerful Duke of Devonshire, the Duchess of Devonshire enjoyed preeminence in society. She was a high emblem of the era. Georgiana was arguably the Diana, Princess of Wales of her time, as her popularity with the press and public can be compared to what her descendant experienced more than two hundred years later. Like Diana, every move Georgiana made was watched by spies around her and then reported on by the press, her every mistake made mockery of the next day in the papers. On a personal note, Georgiana and Diana had in common a famously unhappy marriage, a binging eating disorder, a passionate personality, and a mutual love for their children.

Like her dear friend Marie Antoinette, the Duchess of Devonshire was one of the fashion icons of her time, and her elegantly flashy style made her the leader of fashion in England. Every outfit Georgiana wore, including her hairstyle, was immediately copied by the masses. The fashionable styling of her hair alone reached literally extraordinary heights above her exuberant outfits.

Using her influence as a leading socialite and fashion icon, the Duchess of Devonshire contributed to politics, science, and literature. As part of her illustrious social engagements, the Duchess would gather around her a large salon of literary and political figures. Among her major acquaintances were the most influential figures of her time, including the Prince of Wales (later King George IV); Marie Antoinette of France and her favourite in court, the Duchess of Polignac; Charles Grey (later Earl Grey and British Prime Minister); and Lady Melbourne (lover of the Prince of Wales). Newspapers chronicled her every appearance and activity.

She was called a "phenomenon" by Horace Walpole who proclaimed, "[she] effaces all without being a beauty; but her youthful figure, flowing good nature, sense and lively modesty, and modest familiarity make her a phenomenon". Madame d'Arblay, who had a preference for acquaintances of talent, found that her appeal was not generally for her beauty but for far more which included fine "manner, politeness, and gentle quiet." Sir Nathaniel Wraxall stated that her success as an individual lay "in the amenity and graces of her deportment, in her irresistible manners, and the seduction of her society."

Famously, when the Duchess was stepping out of her carriage one day, an Irish dustman exclaimed: "Love and bless you, my lady, let me light my pipe in your eyes!" Thereafter, whenever others would compliment her, the Duchess would retort, "After the dustman's compliment, all others are insipid."

Politics

The Spencer family, from which the Duchess derived, was an ardent supporter of the Whig party as were she and the Cavendish family. However, because the Duke's high position in the peerage disallowed him from participating so commonly in politics, Georgiana took it as a positive outlet for herself. In an age when the realisation of women's rights and suffrage were still more than a century away, Georgiana became a political activist as the first woman to make active and influential front line appearances on the political scene. Having begun her involvement in politics in 1778 (when she inspired a mass of women to promote the Whig party), she relished enlightenment and Whig party ideals and took it upon herself to campaign—particularly for a distant cousin, Charles James Fox, who was chief party leader alongside Richard Brinsley Sheridan—for Whig policies which were anti-monarchy and advocated for liberty against tyranny.

At the time of her involvement, King George III (who detested the Whigs) and his ministers had a direct influence over the House of Commons, principally through their power of patronage. The Prince of Wales, who always relished going against the grain with his father, joined the Whig party when his friend, the Duchess, became involved. She was renowned for hosting dinners that became political meetings, and she took joy in cultivating the company of brilliant radicals.

During the general election of 1784, Georgiana became a major subject of scrutiny. Fanciful rumours and political cartoons circulated during the campaign, ridiculing her for securing votes in exchange for sexual—and monetary—rewards. Thomas Rowlandson even satirised her with a rumour of her trading kisses in his print "THE DEVONSHIRE, or Most Approved Method of Securing Votes". Her mother pleaded with her to step down. Still, Georgiana was not daunted and was adamant in her activism. On election day, the Duchess of Devonshire walked the streets of London, even gaining blisters on her feet, meeting face-to-face with commoners as equals. She was instrumental in the success of Fox and Lord Hood. Regardless, after the extensive campaigning and negative media onslaught against her, she retired after the win from the political arena for a while. In 1788, she returned to political activism, however, behind the scenes.

Even in the last years of her life, she pushed ahead in the field and attempted to help rebuild the Whig party, which had become fragmented; her efforts were to no avail, and the political party would eventually come to dissolve decades after her death.

Literature

In her life, the Duchess was an avid writer and composed several works, of both prose and poetry, of which some were published.

She composed poetry as a young girl to her father, and some of it later circulated in manuscript. It was read by Walpole (who said it was "easy and prettily expressed, though it does not express much") and Reverend William Mason (who was more favorable with higher opinions).

The first of her published literary works was Emma; Or, The Unfortunate Attachment: A Sentimental Novel in 1773.

In 1778, Georgiana released epistolary novel The Sylph. Published anonymously, it had autobiographical elements, centering on a fictional aristocratic bride who had been corrupted, and as "a novel-cum-exposé of [the duchess's] aristocratic cohorts, depicted as libertines, blackmailers, and alcoholics." It has been speculated that The Sylph may have instead been written by Sophia Briscoe, and a receipt at the British Library suggests that Briscoe was paid for the published work. However, it is thought more likely that Briscoe may have served as an intermediary between the Duchess of Devonshire and her publisher so that the duchess could keep her anonymity. Georgiana is said to have at least privately admitted to her authorship. The Sylph was a success and underwent four reprintings.

Memorandums of the Face of the Country in Switzerland (1799) is often wrongly attributed to Georgiana. It was in fact written by Rowley Lascelles, based on a Swiss tour in 1794.

One more piece was published in the last years of Georgiana's life, The Passage of the Mountain of Saint Gothard, first in an unauthorised version in the 'Morning Chronicle' and 'Morning Post' of 20 and 21 December 1799, then in a privately printed edition in 1800. A poem dedicated to her children, The Passage of the Mountain of Saint Gothard was based on her passage of the Saint Gotthard Pass, with Bess, between 10 and 15 August 1793 on returning to England. The thirty-stanza poem, together with 28 extended notes, were furthermore translated into some of the main languages of Western Europe including into French, by Jacques Delille, in 1802; Italian, by Gaetano Polidori, in 1803; and German in 1805. The Passage of the Mountain of Saint Gothard was then reprinted in 1816, after Georgiana's death. Samuel Taylor Coleridge published a glowing response to the poem, 'Ode to Georgiana, Duchess of Devonshire' in the 'Morning Post' on 24 December 1799.

The 5th Duchess of Devonshire was connected to some of the greatest men of letters of her time, and Samuel Johnson, a famed writer of the era, had even paid a visit to the Duke and Duchess, in 1784, at their Chatsworth home.

Science
The Duchess had a small laboratory where she conducted chemistry experiments and studied geology, natural history and was most passionate for mineralogy. In addition to her scientific curiosity, Georgiana wanted to contribute to her children's education.

Her interest in science arose in part as she was related through marriage to the pneumatic chemist Henry Cavendish whose lab she visited in Clapham. The Duchess frequently engaged in scientific dialogue with prominent scientists of the era including Sir Charles Blagden, Professor Henri Struve, Horace Bénédict de Saussure, Sir Joseph Banks, Sir William Hamilton, Professor Gian Vincenzo Petrini, White Watson, Bryan Higgins, and Benjamin Thompson. Her knowledge of chemistry and mineralogy was regarded as genius as Thomas Beddoes wrote to Erasmus Darwin noting Georgiana, "manifested a knowledge of modern chemistry superior to that he should have supposed any duchess or lady in England was possessed of". Petrini, Blagden, and Henry Cavendish likewise contacted her mother Countess Spencer remarking upon the Duchess's aptitude, degree of knowledge she acquired, and extraordinary observations in the field of mineralogy. In pursuit of her interest, she hiked to the summit of Mount Vesuvius to observe and study the active crater and later began the Devonshire Mineral Collection at Chatsworth (the main seat of the dukes of Devonshire).

The Duchess played a key role in formulating, with Thomas Beddoes, the idea of establishing the Pneumatic Institution in Bristol. Her efforts to establish the Pneumatic Institute which advanced the study of factitious airs is an important event that provided framework for modern anesthesia as well as modern biomedical research in gasotransmitters.

Gambling
As was common among the aristocracy of her time, Georgiana routinely gambled for leisure and amusement. Her gaming spiraled into a ruinous addiction, however, made worse by her emotional instability.

In the first years of her marriage, she accumulated debts that surpassed the 4,000 pounds that the Duke provided her annually as pin money. Her own mother disapproved and admonished her, unsuccessfully, to break her habit. After she had first incurred over 3,000 pounds in debt, Georgiana implored her parents to give her a loan as she absolutely would not inform her husband of her debts. Her parents acquiesced and told her to inform the Duke, who nevertheless found out beforehand and repaid them.

For the rest of her life, Georgiana continued to amass an immense, ever-escalating debt that she always tried to keep hidden from her husband (even though he was among the richest men in the land). While she would admit to some amount, it was always less than the total, which even she could not keep up with. In confidence, she would ask for loans from the Prince of Wales. At one point, to try to settle some of her debts, she did not shrink from pressing her friend, the affluent banker Thomas Coutts for funds.

Later life and death
Her absence from English society and exile in France had isolated Georgiana and was a low point for her in every respect; she returned to England, a "changed woman". The Duke began suffering from gout, and she spent her time at his side nursing him. With also a new miscarriage, this circumstance with her husband brought about a softening and closeness between the spouses. She took a positive interest in science, took up writing again (producing two more works), and even continued her political activism while trying to rebuild the Whig party (to no avail before its end). Georgiana also came to meet and become friends with the wife of her former lover, Charles Grey.

In 1796, Georgiana succumbed to illness in one eye; the medical treatment resulted in a scarring of her face. However, "Those scars released her from her fears. All the inhibitions about whether she was beautiful enough or whether she was up to the job left her". In her late thirties, Georgiana was able to regain pre-eminence and enjoyment in open society, although her personal life would continue to be marred by degrees of unhappiness, debt, and decline in health.

During her early forties, the Duchess of Devonshire devoted her time to the coming out of her eldest daughter, Lady Georgiana Dorothy Cavendish. The debutante was presented in 1800, and the Duchess saw her daughter wed Lord Morpeth, the heir apparent of the Earl of Carlisle, in 1801; it was the first and only time the Duchess of Devonshire saw one of her issue marry.

Georgiana's health continued to decline well into her forties, and her gambling addiction continued. She once reached out to her mother, begging for a sum of 100 pounds and complaining to her of jaundice. While her mother at first believed her daughter was just ill from her gambling, Countess Spencer, as well as those around Georgiana, soon came to realise she was truly sick. She was thought to be suffering from an abscess on her liver.

Georgiana Cavendish, Duchess of Devonshire, died on 30 March 1806, at 3:30, at the age of 48. She was surrounded by her husband, the 5th Duke of Devonshire; her mother, Countess Spencer; her sister, the Countess of Bessborough; her eldest daughter, Lady Morpeth (who was eight months pregnant); and Lady Elizabeth Foster. They were all said to have been inconsolable over her death. For the first time, the Duke showed moving emotion towards his late wife, as a contemporary wrote, "The Duke has been most deeply affected and has shown more feeling than anyone thought possible—indeed every individual in the family are in a dreadful state of affliction." Her distant cousin, Charles James Fox, for whom she had triumphantly campaigned, was noted to have cried. The Prince of Wales himself lamented, "The best natured and the best-bred woman in England is gone." Thousands of the people of London congregated at Piccadilly, where the Cavendish family's town house was located, to mourn her. She was buried at the family vault at All Saints Parish Church (now Derby Cathedral) in Derby.

Legacy

The legacy of the life of Georgiana Cavendish, Duchess of Devonshire has remained a topic of study and intrigue in cultural and historical spheres centuries after her death.

Immediately after her death, the Duke of Devonshire discovered the extent of her debts. He soon enough married Lady Elizabeth Foster, who became Duchess of Devonshire as his second wife.

Georgiana's children were discontented with the marriage as they never liked Lady Elizabeth at all (something which caused dismay with their mother when she was alive). When William Cavendish, 5th Duke of Devonshire, died on 29 July 1811, the Marquess of Hartington became 6th Duke of Devonshire. He sought to liquidate his late mother's entire debts. Meanwhile, Lady Elizabeth fought to keep Cavendish properties to which she wasn't entitled; furthermore, the 6th Duke denied her demand that her illegitimate son with the 5th Duke of Devonshire, Clifford, bear the Cavendish crest. Infuriated, Lady Elizabeth brought back up her affair with the 5th Duke of Devonshire by publicly announcing he had sired her illegitimate children. The 6th Duke of Devonshire finally oversaw an end to it all—the mistake of his late mother of bringing in Lady Elizabeth into her life and all the ensuing consequences—with the final dismissal of Lady Elizabeth by paying her off. Nevertheless, Georgiana's children lived the remainder of their lives with mutually positive relations with Lady Elizabeth Foster's children, having grown up together.

In 1786, Susanna Rowson, who went on to become a bestselling author, dedicated her first published work, Victoria, to the Duchess of Devonshire.

With the topic of liberation at the heart of policies she supported in life, the bold involvement of the Duchess of Devonshire in political activism pioneered women's public frontstage and influential participation in the field in a time before the validation of women's rights and subsequent feminist ideals.

Artwork representing the Duchess of Devonshire by reputable painters of the Georgian era remain, including a 1787 portrait by the famed Thomas Gainsborough which was once thought lost.

Over 1,000 personal letters written by the Duchess of Devonshire remain in existence. Chatsworth, the duke of Devonshire's seat, houses a majority of her letters in historical archives.

In modern times, her life's circumstances are seen as an example of female oppression by historical, cultural and legal constructs favoring male interests while denying rights to the female party in a relationship. They have become the subject of scholarly and dramatised works.

Film portrayals

 The Divine Lady (1929), portrayed by Evelyn Hall
 Berkeley Square (1933), portrayed by Juliette Compton
 The House in the Square (also titled I'll Never Forget You (US) and Man of Two Worlds) (1951), portrayed by Kathleen Byron
 The Duchess (2008),  portrayed by Keira Knightley and directed by Saul Dibb, based on the biography Georgiana, Duchess of Devonshire by Amanda Foreman

Opera pasticcio

 ’’Georgiana’’ (2019), was commissioned by the Buxton Festival for its 40th anniversary, and was premièred there on 7 July 2019.

Works by Georgiana Cavendish

Emma; Or, The Unfortunate Attachment: A Sentimental Novel (1773)
The Sylph (1778)
The Passage of the Mountain of Saint Gothard (1799)

Gallery

References

Works cited

Further reading

 Lewis, Judith S. Sacred to Female Patriotism: Gender, Class, and Politics in Late Georgian Britain. New York: Routledge, 2003.
 Macintyre, Ben. "The Disappearing Duchess." The New York Times. 31 July 1994.
 Rauser, Ameilia F. "The Butcher-Kissing Duchess of Devonshire: Between Caricature and Allegory in 1784." Eighteenth-Century Studies, 36 no. 1 (Fall 2002): 23–46.
Masters, Brian. Georgiana Duchess of Devonshire, 1981.
Georgiana, The Earl of Bessborough (editor), John Murray, London, 1955.
Some Old Time Beauties by Thomson Willing Featuring a different version of her picture as well as written material on her reputation.
The Two Duchesses.., Family Correspondence relating to.., Vere Foster (editor), Blackie & Son, London, Glasgow & Dublin, 1898.
An Aristocratic Affair – The life of Georgiana's sister Harriet, Countess Bessborough, Janet Gleeson, 2006, 
Georgiana Duchess of Devonshire, The Sylph, ed. Jonathan David Gross (Chicago: Northwestern University Press, 2007),

External links

 Georgiana Cavendish, Duchess of Devonshire at the Eighteenth-Century Poetry Archive (ECPA)
 
 
 

1757 births
1806 deaths
English duchesses by marriage
British socialites
Daughters of British earls
British salon-holders
English political hostesses
Georgiana Cavendish, Duchess of Devonshire
Georgiana Cavendish, Duchess of Devonshire
18th-century British women writers
18th-century English novelists
British women novelists
18th-century women scientists
18th-century English women
18th-century English people
Wives of knights